Nothing Personal is a 2009 Dutch-Irish drama film written and directed by Urszula Antoniak. It was presented at the Locarno International Film Festival for the international competition. It won the Golden Leopard for best debut film and Lotte Verbeek won the award for best actress.
The film won four Golden Calves at the Dutch Film Festival of 2009, including best film.

Plot

A young Dutch woman packs her bags and leaves for Ireland. 
"Alone in her empty flat, from her window Anne observes the people passing by who nervously snatch up the personal belongings and pieces of furniture she has put out on the pavement. Her final gesture of taking a ring off her finger signals she is leaving her previous life in Holland behind. She goes to Ireland, where she chooses to lead a solitary, wandering existence, striding through the austere landscapes of Connemara. During her travels, she discovers a house that is home to a hermit, Martin". (Warsaw Film Festival)

Reception
On Rotten Tomatoes it has an approval rating of 82% based on reviews from 11 critics. On Metacritic it has a score of 71% based on reviews from 6 critics.

Derek Elley of Variety was critical of the script but says the film succeeds "Largely thanks to Verbeek's performance, full of physical grace notes and small details, she manages to involve the audience, even though her character is more a movie creation than one based in real psychology."

References

External links
 
 

2009 films
Irish drama films
Dutch drama films
English-language Dutch films
English-language Irish films
Golden Leopard winners